Nikolay Hristov may refer to:

 Nikolay Hristov (footballer, born 1989), Bulgarian footballer for Lokomotiv Gorna Oryahovitsa

See also
 Nikola Hristov, Bulgarian footballer for Dunav Ruse